Kubuna is one of the three confederacies that make up Fiji's House of Chiefs, to which all of Fiji's chiefs belong.

Details of Kubuna
It consists of the provinces of Tailevu, Naitasiri, Lomaiviti, Ra and parts of the western province of Ba. Most of Kubuna is located in the northern part of Fiji's Central Division.

The capital of the confederacy is the chiefly island of Bau in Tailevu. While Kubuna is foremost the i-cavuti of Bau, the name is also shared by certain provinces or vanua that were her allies or influenced by her in the past, which are now part of the confederacy.

Paramount Titles of Kubuna
The Paramount Chief of Kubuna, who is generally considered to be the highest-ranked chief in Fiji, is the 'Turaga Bale Na Tui Kaba', Vunivalu of Bau. A position that has been vacant since the death of Ratu Sir George Cakobau, a former Governor General, in 1989. Succession is not necessarily from father to son, although there is a hereditary element.  Currently, there are three eligible contenders, namely Ratu George Cakobau, Jr., his brother Ratu Epenisa Cakobau and their cousin Ratu George Kadavulevu Naulivou.  It is thought that clan politics is part of the reason why none of these candidates has, of yet, been installed. It is said that the nomination of Ratu George Kadavulevu Naulivou has been disqualified based on the basis that his father was born out of wedlock. Also listed as a possible candidate is Fiji's former President, Ratu Epeli Nailatikau; however he too is considered by some to be disqualified as he is only connected through maternal links being a descendant of Ratu Edward Tuivanuavou Tugi Cakobau, a product of an extra-marital liaison by Cakobau's granddaughter Adi Litia Cakobau with (the then married) King George Tupou II of Tonga.

Another high chief from Kubuna is the Roko Tui Bau, most recently Ratu Joni Madraiwiwi, the former Vice-President of Fiji who died in 2016.  According to sources within the Great Council of Chiefs (a traditional body which, among other things, used to function as an electoral college to choose the President and Vice-President), he was chosen for the Vice-Presidency because it was thought that as President Ratu Josefa Iloilo was from the Burebasaga and his predecessor, Ratu Sir Kamisese Mara from Tovata, the new Vice-President should be from Kubuna.
On 6 December 2006 he was ousted from office by coup leader Voreqe Bainimarama and the office of Vice-President has been suspended ever since.

References

 Planets Around the Sun: dynamics and contradictions of the Fijian Matanitu - Page 13, By Nicholas P. G. Thomas - 1986, Reference to Kubuna and its origins
 Apologies To   Thucydides: Understanding History as Culture and Vice Versa - Page 64, by Marshall David Sahlins, reference to Kubuna and its origins
 Yalo i Viti: Shades of Viti : a Fiji Museum Catalogue - Page 173 by Fergus Clunie, Fiji Museum, Julia Brooke-White - 1986; following is a snippet: Leha died trying to save Niumataiwalu, the father of the first Tui Nayau to rule Lakeba. Ironically, Niumataiwalu, who was assassinated at Ono in a plot... Folk-Lore: A Quarterly Review of Myth, Tradition, Institution, and Custom, Page 119 by Sidgwick; By Folklore Society, (Great Britain), Parish Register Society, (Great Britain), Published 1977, Northern Micrographics for Brookhaven Press, Original from the University of Michigan, Digitized Jul 14, 2006. Following a snippet: In the island of Lakemba, Fiji, the nobility is all descended from Niumataiwalu.It is divided into four clans, which I will call A, B, C, and D...

External links
 Maori News (Fiji supplement)
 Vunivalu of Bau
 Nakorotubu District Origin of the 1st Vunivalu of Bau - Nailatikau 1 Vunivalu Genealogy presented on page 31 by the late Ratu Joni Madraiwiwi, Roko Tui Bau & 2005-2007 Vice President of Fiji in 'The Life and Times of Cakobau: The Bauan State to 1855'- A thesis submitted for the degree of Doctor of Philosophy in the University of Otago, New Zealand By Hurray P. Heasley, B.A. (Hons.), Otago. August, 2010. Genealogy presented on page 31 by the late Ratu Joni Madraiwiwi, Roko Tui Bau & 2005-2007 Vice President of Fiji in 'The Life and Times of Cakobau: The Bauan State to 1855'- A thesis submitted for the degree of Doctor of Philosophy in the University of Otago, New Zealand By Hurray P. Heasley, B.A. (Hons.), Otago. August, 2010. 

Confederacies of Fiji
Fijian chiefs
Ba Province
Lomaiviti Province
Naitasiri Province
Ra Province
Tailevu Province